Joel Bennett Clark (January 8, 1890 – July 13, 1954), better known as Bennett Champ Clark, was a Democratic United States senator from Missouri from 1933 until 1945, and was later a circuit judge of the District of Columbia Circuit.  He was a leading isolationist in foreign policy.  In domestic policy he was an anti-New Deal Conservative Democrat who helped organize the bipartisan Conservative coalition.

Education and start of career

Clark was born into a political family; his father was Champ Clark, who served as Speaker of the United States House of Representatives.  His mother was Genevieve Davis (Bennett) Clark.  Clark's sister, Genevieve Clark Thomson was also active in politics as a women's suffrage activist.

Clark was born in Bowling Green, Missouri, and was raised and educated in Bowling Green and Washington, D.C.  He was a graduate of Washington, D.C.'s Eastern High School.  Clark graduated from the University of Missouri in Columbia, Missouri with a Bachelor of Arts degree in 1912 and was a member of Phi Beta Kappa.  In 1914, he graduated from the George Washington University Law School with a Bachelor of Laws.  In addition to Phi Beta Kappa, Clark's other academic affiliations included Order of the Coif, Delta Sigma Rho, Delta Tau Delta, and Phi Delta Phi.

Clark became parliamentarian of the United States House of Representatives in 1913, while still in law school.  He served until 1917, when he resigned in order to join the United States Army for World War I.  In 1916, he was chosen to serve as parliamentarian of that year's Democratic National Convention.

Military service
Clark joined the United States Army in 1917, completed Citizens' Military Training Camp training at Fort Myer, Virginia, and was commissioned as a captain.  He was then elected lieutenant colonel and second in command of the 6th Missouri Infantry Regiment, a unit of the Missouri National Guard. This unit was subsequently called to federal service as the 140th Infantry Regiment, a unit of the 35th Division. After arriving in France, Clark served on the headquarters staffs of both the 35th and 88th Divisions. In 1919, Clark was promoted to colonel while serving in the post-war Army that occupied Germany. He was an organizer of the first American Legion convention in Paris, and was elected as the organization's first national commander. After leaving the Army in 1919, Clark maintained a lifelong active interest in the 35th Division Veterans Association, the American Legion, and the Veterans of Foreign Wars. From 1919 to 1922, Clark served as president of the National Guard Association of the United States.

Continued career
In 1919, Clark began practicing law in St. Louis, Missouri. In the 1920s he researched and authored a biography of John Quincy Adams, and was active in politics as a campaign speaker for Democratic candidates in Missouri. In 1928 he considered running for the United States Senate seat of the retiring James A. Reed, but decided not to make the race.

Clark was a delegate to the 1928 Democratic National Convention.  He served again as a delegate to the Democratic National Convention of 1936.  He was a delegate again in 1940, and served as a delegate to the party's national convention in 1944.  In 1944, Clark made the speech nominating Harry S. Truman for vice president.

United States senator
In the 1932 election, Clark ran for the United States Senate seat held by the retiring Harry B. Hawes, and relied on his base among veterans to defeat two other candidates for the Democratic nomination. Clark defeated Henry Kiel in the general election for the term beginning March 4, 1933. Hawes resigned on February 3, 1933, a month before his term was to end, and Clark was appointed to fill the vacancy, gaining seniority on other senators elected in 1932. Clark was re-elected in the 1938 election, and served from February 3, 1933, to January 3, 1945. In 1944, Clark was an unsuccessful candidate for renomination, losing the Democratic primary to state Attorney General Roy McKittrick, who lost the general election to Republican Governor Forrest C. Donnell.

Elected in November 1934 the other senator for Missouri was Harry S Truman.

Clark was chairman of the Senate Committee on Interoceanic Canals from 1937 to 1935.  He was a member of the Smithsonian Institution's Board of Regents from 1940 to 1944.

In April 1943, a confidential analysis of the Senate Foreign Relations Committee (of which Clark was a member) by British scholar Isaiah Berlin for the British Foreign Office succinctly characterized Clark as:
a rabid isolationist and member of the American First Committee who has steadily voted against all the foreign policies and war measures of the Administration with the exception of the reciprocal trade agreements (in which the corn exporters of Missouri have some interest). A member of the Wheeler-Nye-[Robert A.] Taft coterie. An avowed Anglophobe.

On January 29, 1944, Clark declared on the floor of the Senate that Emperor Hirohito should be hanged as a war criminal at the war's end. In the same year, he was the first senator to introduce the G.I. Bill proposal in the United States Congress.

When Congress began work on the G.I. Bill in 1944 it had originally expressed concern about possible misuse of the "blue discharge" (now called an "Other Than Honorable discharge"). In testimony before the United States Senate, Rear Admiral Randall Jacobs strongly opposed the provision to include Veterans with blue discharges on the grounds that it would undermine morale and remove any incentive to maintain a good service record. Senator Clark, a sponsor (writer) of the GI Bill, dismissed his concerns, calling them "some of the most stupid, short-sighted objections which could be raised". Clark went on to say:

The Army is giving Blue discharges, namely discharges without honor, to those who have had no fault other than they have not shown sufficient aptitude for military service. I say that when the government puts a man in the military service and, thereafter, because the man does not show sufficient aptitude gives him a blue discharge, or a discharge without honor, that fact should not be permitted to prevent the man from receiving the benefits to which soldiers are generally entitled.

Federal judicial service
Clark was nominated by President Harry S. Truman on September 12, 1945, to an Associate Justice seat on the United States Court of Appeals for the District of Columbia (United States Circuit Judge of the United States Court of Appeals for the District of Columbia Circuit from June 25, 1948) vacated by Associate Justice Thurman Arnold. He was confirmed by the United States Senate on September 24, 1945, and received his commission on September 28, 1945. His service terminated on July 13, 1954, due to his death.

Death and burial
Clark was ill during the last year of his life and died in Gloucester, Massachusetts on July 13, 1954.  He was buried at Arlington National Cemetery.

Awards
Clark was the recipient of honorary degrees from several colleges and universities.  He received honorary LL.D. degrees from the University of Missouri, Marshall College, Bethany College, and Washington and Lee University.

Family
In 1922, Clark married Miriam Marsh, the daughter of Wilbur W. Marsh. They were the parents of three children, Champ, Marsh, and Kimball. Miriam Clark died in 1943, and in 1945 Clark married British actress Violet Heming.  The ceremony took place at the Berryville, Virginia home of Clark's sister, and President Truman served as best man.

In popular culture
Clark and other isolationist senators are referenced in the Woody Guthrie song Mister Charlie Lindbergh.  Guthrie's 1943 lyrics condemn pre-World War II isolationism and advocate for leaders committed to defeating fascism.

See also
 List of members of the American Legion

References

External sources

Further reading
 

1890 births
1954 deaths
20th-century American judges
American Presbyterians
Burials at Arlington National Cemetery
Democratic Party United States senators from Missouri
George Washington University Law School alumni
Judges of the United States Court of Appeals for the D.C. Circuit
Military personnel from Missouri
Missouri Democrats
Old Right (United States)
Organization founders
People from Bowling Green, Missouri
Lawyers from Washington, D.C.
United States Army colonels
United States court of appeals judges appointed by Harry S. Truman
University of Missouri alumni
Eastern High School (Washington, D.C.) alumni